Santa Teresa, California may refer to:

Santa Teresa (fictional city), home to Sue Grafton's fictional female private investigator Kinsey Millhone
Santa Teresa, San Jose, California, a neighborhood in southern San Jose, California, USA
Santa Teresa, alternate name for Tukutnut, California